See You on the Other Side is the seventh studio album by American nu metal band Korn. It was released on December 6, 2005, by Virgin Records. It is their first album as a quartet after the departure of long-time guitarist Brian "Head" Welch and the last album with original drummer David Silveria before he had departed from the band in December 2006. The album was first certified gold in the United States on January 12, 2006; a subsequent platinum record certification was awarded on March 16, 2006. The album is best known for the involvement of renowned production team The Matrix, who had previously worked with pop acts like Avril Lavigne, Britney Spears, and Shakira. The Matrix's direction gave Korn's music a different sound.
The album features layout design and an original painting by the American surrealist/gothic painter David Stoupakis on the cover.  Eleven more paintings by the artist appear as additional artwork on the deluxe special edition.

Production
After completing their record deal with Sony BMG in 2004, Korn partnered with EMI Records and signed to Virgin Records. As part of this innovative arrangement, Virgin paid Korn $25 million in exchange for a share in the profits of See You on the Other Side and the band's next album, including tours and merchandising. Virgin also received a 30 percent stake in the band's licensing, ticket sales and other revenue sources.  The album was recorded in Jonathan Davis' home studio which was used for the previous album, Take a Look in the Mirror, as well as the Queen of the Damned soundtrack and score. Davis stated "We went through a lot of drama with Head leaving and getting off our label and making the album by ourselves." Regarding Brian "Head" Welch's departure, James "Munky" Shaffer recalled "There was kind of a moment where we didn't know what we were going to do and how we were going to continue. We kind of decided, 'OK, we can just sit back and we can put out a greatest hits album and end this or we can use this opportunity and instead of looking at it as a loss, reinvent what we do.'"

Promotion
The lead single, "Twisted Transistor", premiered on KDGE 102.1 FM The Edge in Dallas-Fort Worth, Texas, and was officially released to radio on September 27, 2005. Brent Decker e-mailed the disc jockey of the night, Ayo, with a request to play the rumored single. The band also did a See You on the Other Side world tour to heavily promote the album, which included a special performance of "Here to Stay" on a plane from London to New York City.

Music
The album shows Korn retaining their typical nu metal style, but also combining elements of genres such as industrial, gothic rock, new wave, electronic/electronica, and funk.

With regards to the album's musical direction, frontman Jonathan Davis commented,

Critical reception

See You on the Other Side received more positive critical reception than the previous studio album, Take a Look in the Mirror, scoring a Metacritic average of 64. Reviewers appreciated the band's desire to experiment and noted that the album combined well their signature sound with the freshness that producers The Matrix and Atticus Ross added to the band's sound.

Commercial performance
See You on the Other Side sold more than 220,000 copies in its first week, debuting and peaking at number three on the Billboard 200. The album managed to stay in the top half of the chart for thirty-four consecutive weeks. It has accumulated 1.2 million copies sold in the United States according to Nielsen SoundScan. The album was ranked second in Ultimate Guitar Archive's Top 10 albums of 2005 poll.

Track listing
This album was released with the Copy Control protection system in some countries.
 The album contains 14 to 16 tracks depending on the version purchased; a special edition of the album contains 20 or 22 total tracks plus two live performance videos.

 Later prints of the album had the song "Twisted Transistor" at a length of 3:08; the 1:04 that was removed was in the pre-gap.
 A promotional "Circuit City" edition was released with a download card for the song "Hypocrites" live in Athens.

Multimedia tracks: "Twisted Transistor" and "Hypocrites" (live, recorded in Luzhniki Arena in Moscow on September 22, 2005)

Personnel

Korn
Jonathan Davis – vocals, bagpipes
James "Munky" Shaffer – guitars, backing vocals
Reginald "Fieldy" Arvizu – bass
David Silveria – drums

Additional musicians
Atticus Ross – programming on tracks 5-8, 13, 14, 3B
Chris "Hollywood" Holmes – additional programming on tracks 1-4, 9-12, 1B, 2B, 4B, 5B
Dante Ross – keyboards on "Twisted Transistor (The Dante Ross Mix)"
Peter Levin – keyboards on "Twisted Transistor (The Dante Ross Mix)"
Jess Blockton – guitars on "Twisted Transistor (The Dante Ross Mix)"
Sergio Vega – bass on "Twisted Transistor (The Dante Ross Mix)"

Production
Jonathan Davis – production
Atticus Ross – production on tracks 5-8, 13, 14, 3B
The Matrix – production on tracks 1-4, 9-12, 1B, 2B, 4B, 5B
Jeffrey Kwatinetz – executive production
Terry Date – mixing
Kevin Mills – mixing assistant
Jon Berkowitz – mixing assistant
Frank Filipetti – recording
Jim Monti – recording assistant
Tim Harking – recording assistant
Leo Ross – production assistant on tracks 5-8, 13, 14, 3B, additional production on "Tearjerker"
Dante Ross – remixing on "Twisted Transistor (The Dante Ross Mix)"
Lucid Olason – engineering, Pro Tools editing
The Dummies – additional remixing & production on "Twisted Transistor (Dummies Club Mix)"
Steve Miller – mixing on "Twisted Transistor (Dummies Club Mix)"
Ted Jensen – mastering

Chart positions

Weekly charts

Year-end charts

Certifications

References

2005 albums
Albums produced by Atticus Ross
Albums produced by the Matrix (production team)
Korn albums
Virgin Records albums